Vijaya Raje (16 September 1919, in Dhar – 21 December 1995) was a member of royal family from Ramgarh in Hazaribagh district of Bihar State of India.

She was member of the 1st Rajya Sabha during 1952–1957 from Bihar State of the Janta Party of Ramgarh Raj. Later she was elected to Lok Sabha from Chatra (Lok Sabha constituency) of Bihar State in 1957, 1962 and 1967 for 2nd, 3rd and 4th Lok Sabha.

References 

1919 births
1995 deaths
People from Hazaribagh
People from Dhar
Rajya Sabha members from Bihar
People from Chatra district
India MPs 1957–1962
Swatantra Party politicians
India MPs 1962–1967
India MPs 1967–1970
Women members of the Lok Sabha
Women members of the Rajya Sabha
Women in Bihar politics
20th-century Indian women
20th-century Indian people